Guibemantis is a frog genus in the mantellid subfamily Mantellinae. This genus is restricted to Madagascar. At present it contains 16 species divided into two subgenera.

Taxonomy
The genus Guibemantis was erected as a subgenus of Mantidactylus by Dubois in 1992 with the type species Guibemantis depressiceps. It was elevated to genus-level in 2006.

In 1994, the subgenus Pandanusicola was erected for a group of species that are strongly associated with Pandanus screw-palms. It was originally proposed as an additional subgenus of Mantidactylus, but when Guibemantis was elevated to genus-level in 2006, Pandanusicola was made a subgenus of it.

Species
This genus is divided into two subgenera:
 Guibemantis Dubois, 1992
 Guibemantis depressiceps (Boulenger, 1882)
 Guibemantis kathrinae (Glaw, Vences, and Gossmann, 2000)
 Guibemantis timidus (Vences and Glaw, 2005)
 Guibemantis tornieri (Ahl, 1928)
 Pandanusicola Glaw & Vences, 1994
 Guibemantis albolineatus (Blommers-Schlösser and Blanc, 1991)
 Guibemantis albomaculatus Lehtinen, Glaw, Vences, Rakotoarison & Scherz, 2018
 Guibemantis annulatus Lehtinen, Glaw, and Vences, 2011
 Guibemantis bicalcaratus (Boettger, 1913)
 Guibemantis diphonus Vences, Jovanovic, Safarek, Glaw, and Köhler, 2015
 Guibemantis flavobrunneus (Blommers-Schlösser, 1979)
 Guibemantis liber (Peracca, 1893)
 Guibemantis methueni (Angel, 1929)
 Guibemantis milingilingy Bletz, Scherz, Rakotoarison, Lehtinen, Glaw & Vences, 2018
 Guibemantis pulcher (Boulenger, 1882)
 Guibemantis punctatus (Blommers-Schlösser, 1979)
 Guibemantis tasifotsy Lehtinen, Glaw, Andreone, Pabijan, and Vences, 2012
 Guibemantis wattersoni Lehtinen, Glaw, and Vences, 2011
 Guibemantis woosteri Lehtinen, Glaw, Vences, Rakotoarison & Scherz, 2018

References

Amphibians of Sub-Saharan Africa
Endemic fauna of Madagascar
Mantellidae
Amphibian genera